Daniel Böhm (also spelled Boehm, born 16 June 1986 in Clausthal-Zellerfeld) is a former German biathlete. In 2009, he completed his first single World Cup Race.

Career highlights
World Cup
2009, Vancouver-Whistler,  3rd at team relay (with Schempp / Peiffer / Rösch)
2009, Vancouver-Whistler,  2nd at 20 km individual

References

External links 
 
 
 

1986 births
Living people
German male biathletes
Biathletes at the 2014 Winter Olympics
Olympic biathletes of Germany
Olympic silver medalists for Germany
Medalists at the 2014 Winter Olympics
Olympic medalists in biathlon
Biathlon World Championships medalists
People from Goslar (district)
Sportspeople from Lower Saxony
21st-century German people